Ivan Bertie O'Neal is a Vincentian politician and leader of the Saint Vincent and the Grenadines Green Party (SVG Green Party). Ivan is also the Saint Vincent and the Grenadines Green Party East St. George candidate for 2020 Vincentian general election.

O'Neal served as treasurer of the Unity Labour Party before breaking ranks with the party in 2000 to join the now-defunct People's Progressive Movement (PPM).  He contested the North Central Winward constituency as a PPM candidate during the 28 March 2001 general election and received 30 votes.

Education 
O'Neal earned a BSc in accounting and finance from Oxford Brookes University, an MSc in Macro Economics, Policy and Planning from the University of Bradford, and an MBA from the University of Leicester.

Career 
In the 2005 general elections, he contested the East Saint George constituency seat representing the SVG Green Party and was defeated, winning only 14 votes. In the 2010 general elections O'Neal ran in Central Kingstown, where he won 12 votes.

References

External links
SVG Green Party

Living people
Saint Vincent and the Grenadines Green Party politicians
Unity Labour Party politicians
People's Progressive Movement (Saint Vincent and the Grenadines) politicians
Year of birth missing (living people)

Alumni of Oxford Brookes University
Alumni of the University of Bradford
Alumni of the University of Leicester